Autumn Leaves may refer to:

 Autumn leaf color, a phenomenon affecting deciduous plants by autumn
 Autumn Leaves (film), a 1956 film directed by Robert Aldrich
 Autumn Leaves (painting), an 1856 painting by John Everett Millais
 Aŭtunaj folioj (English: Autumn leaves), a posthumous poetry collection by Julio Baghy
 Autumn Leaves (magazine), a former children's magazine of the Reorganized Church of Jesus Christ of Latter Day Saints

Music 
 "Autumn Leaves" (1945 song), a jazz standard written by Joseph Kosma. Recordings feature on:
 Autumn Leaves (Cannonball Adderley album), 1963
 Autumn Leaves (Bill Evans album), 1999
 Autumn Leaves, an album by Don Byas
 Autumn Leaves (Nat Adderley album)
 "Autumn Leaves" (Daniel Kajmakoski song), North Macedonia's 2015 Eurovision entry
 "Autumn Leaves", a song by Ved Buens Ende from Written in Waters
 "Autumn Leaves", a song by Ed Sheeran from +
 "Autumn Leaves", a song by Chris Brown from X
 "The Autumn Leaves", a song by ATB from No Silence

Television
 "Autumn Leaves", an episode of the TV series Handy Manny
 "Autumn Leaves", an episode of the TV series Rugrats
 "Autumn Leaves", an episode of the TV series The Wombles